...Six Pack Shy Of Pretty is the second album released by the Florida-based hard rock music group, Crease. This album was released in 1998, via Whateverman Records.

Track listing
 "Building Up"  – 3:36
 "Jenny 867-5309"  – 3:14
 "Frustration" – 4:32
 "Making Progress"  – 3:28
 "Non-User"  – 2:41

Personnel
Crease:
Kelly Meister - lead vocals
Fritz Dorigo - guitars, vocals
Greg Gershengorn - bass, vocals
Eric Dorigo - drums, percussion

Production
Paul Trust – producer, mixer, engineer
Crease - producer

References 

1998 albums